Daniel Webster Huff (September 20, 1854 - June 4, 1940) was a Democratic Mississippi state legislator in the early 20th century.

Biography 
Daniel Webster Huff was born on September 20, 1854, in Old Centreville, Amite County, Mississippi. He was the son of Holloway Huff and his wife, Caroline (Pomeroy) Huff. Daniel relocated to nearby Wilkinson County and became a cotton planter. He served as a member of the Board of Supervisors of Wilkinson County. In 1903, he was elected to the Mississippi House of Representatives, where he represented Wilkinson County as a Democrat from 1904 to 1908. In 1915, he was elected to the Mississippi State Senate, representing the state's 7th district. He died at his home in Centreville on June 4, 1940.

Personal life 
He was a Presbyterian. He married Mary Narcissus Lanehart in 1877. After her death, he remarried Birdie Albertine Whetstone in 1902. He had nine children, eight from his first marriage, and one from his second.

References 

1854 births
1940 deaths
Democratic Party Mississippi state senators
Democratic Party members of the Mississippi House of Representatives
People from Centreville, Mississippi